The 2004 Rally d'Italia Sardegna (formally the 1st Supermag Rally Italia Sardinia) was the thirteenth round of the 2004 World Rally Championship season. The race was held over three days between 1 October and 3 October 2004, and was based in Olbia, Italy. Subaru's Petter Solberg won the race, his 10th win in the World Rally Championship and 3rd in a row.

Background

Entry list

Itinerary
All dates and times are CEST (UTC+2).

Results

Overall

World Rally Cars

Classification

Special stages

Championship standings

Junior World Rally Championship

Classification

Special stages

Championship standings

References

External links 
 Official website of the World Rally Championship

Rally d'Italia Sardegna
Rally d'Italia Sardegna